Mammillaria elegans is a species of cacti in the tribe Cacteae. It is native to Mexico. Mammillaria elegans A.P. de Candolle 1828. is a 'nomen confusum' (confused name) also applied to Mammillaria haageana subsp. elegans and refers both to Mammillaria geminispina with latex in the stem (subgenus Mammillaria section Hydrochylus series supertextae ) and to Mammillaria haageana, without latex in the stem (subgenus Mammillaria, section Galactophylous, series Leucocephale)
Habit: Solitary, seldom branching cactus.

Names brought to synonymy:
 Mammillaria elegans var. supertexta (Mart.) Schelle, 1907 or  Mammillaria elegans var. lanata (Britton & Rose) B.Hofmann, 1986, synonyms for Mammillaria supertexta

References

External links
 Mammillaria elegans at Tropicos

Plants described in 1828
elegans
Controversial taxa